Bus Driver is a bus driving simulator game developed by SCS Software. The game was released digitally, for Microsoft Windows on 22 March 2007, and for OS X on 8 June 2011. A port to iOS, entitled Bus Driver – Pocket Edition, was released to the App Store by Meridian4 on 27 February 2014.

Gameplay 
The player selects a route from tiers (described below), and then after a short loading time, the player sees the selected bus either at a bus depot or terminal. After halting at the first stop, the bus must be driven along the correct route (indicated at intersections by orange arrows) whilst obeying all traffic rules and stopping at all bus stops. If the player fails to do so, points will be taken from their score. When the game begins, one tier of routes, which includes six buses, is available. In total, there are six tiers, thirty-six routes and thirteen buses (seventeen in Temsa Edition). To unlock the next tier, the player must drive at least four of the routes successfully. As the game progresses, routes become more tedious. The player will lose points if they disobey traffic laws (going out of lane without using blinkers, driving on the wrong side of the road, hitting other vehicles, hitting obstacles like streetlamp), upset passengers (by braking too hard or causing accidents) or they depart from the bus stop too early, honking at the passengers to make them board faster at the bus stop or even if they leave passengers waiting at a bus stop. Conversely, the player will gain points for obeying traffic laws, safe driving and being punctual.

Despite being a game set in the United States, many of the bus stop names and cities are named after areas of London, including Debden, Collier Row, Feltham, Potters Bar and the terminus Westminster.

If the player scores points more than 0, then the drive would be a successful drive. If the players score less points than 0, then it will be an unsuccessful drive.

There are two camera angles (bumper and chase view). Occasionally, there are visuals of rain. If there is rain happening, then the wipers will function automatically. You can also switch on the blinkers. There is an accelerator and a brake. There is steering as well.  Each drive will take place during the day, or at nighttime, depending to the route described. After you choose the route, you can view the description of the route and bus no. before you start the game. There is a time table. There is also a tab showing what is the distance to the next bus stop.

Buses 
The game contains a variety of buses which are based on real life buses. As a game set in the United States, most of the buses are based on American designs, however, there are some which are based on European designs since the game was made in the Czech Republic. The buses included are 3 MCI 102D3 (known as GNR-13 LE, including a jail variant which is known as GNR-13 Eco), a Ford B-Series school bus (known as Toucan), a MCI D4500 coach (known as Gryphon Birdie), 2 NovaBus RTS-06 (known as Niva WS-27 Cityroamer), 2 Setra S415HDH (known as Sista XT), 2 Renault Agora S (known as Remark EU) and a Volvo B7TL Wright Eclipse Gemini double decker (known as Velven 18). The Temsa Edition included the Temsa Avenue, Temsa Tourmalin IC, Temsa Opalin, TEMSA Safari HD and the Temsa Diamond.

Tiers 
The initial game contains five tiers. An additional tier was added in Bus Driver Temsa Edition and in Bus Driver Gold Edition. Each tier contains six different routes. To unlock the next tier, the player must drive at least four of the routes successfully. As the game progresses, routes become longer and more complicated. As mentioned above, you have to score more than 0 points to complete each level. Therefore, you have to maintain an formal speed which gives you advantages: 1. You will reach the destination in time. 2. You can brake slowly so that passengers are not disappointed at sharp braking. 3. You will get points for reaching in time and obeying traffic signals.

Reception 
Bus Driver was not designed as a bus simulator, but is often considered to be one. Reviewers have suggested that an inside view would improve the gameplay; however, the developers have stated that this was omitted because the game was not designed to be an exact simulator.

References

External links 
 

2007 video games
Bus simulation video games
IOS games
MacOS games
SCS Software games
Video games developed in the Czech Republic
Windows games
Single-player video games
Meridian4 games